Mathieu Chouinard (born April 11, 1980) is a Canadian former professional ice hockey goaltender who played one game in the National Hockey League, with the Los Angeles Kings during the 2003–04 season. The rest of his career, which lasted from 2000 to 2006, was spent in the minor leagues. He was selected by the Ottawa Senators 15th overall in the 1998 NHL Entry Draft, and after failing to agree to a contract re-entered the draft, and in 2000 was again selected by the Senators, 45th overall.

Career 
As a youth, Chouinard played in the 1994 Quebec International Pee-Wee Hockey Tournament with a minor ice hockey team from the Mille-Îles area of Laval, Quebec.

Chouinard compiled a 104-60-13 record with the Shawinigan Cataractes and was selected by the Ottawa Senators in the first round (15th overall) of the 1998 NHL Entry Draft. By 2000, unable to agree to terms on a contract with the Senators, he instead opted back into the NHL draft. Hoping for a fresh start with a new organization, Chouinard was instead selected once more by the Senators, this time in Round 2 (45th overall) of the 2000 NHL Entry Draft.

Chouinard spent three seasons in the Senators' organization, winning the Harry "Hap" Holmes Memorial Award (shared with Martin Prusek and Simon Lajeunesse) during the 2001–02 American Hockey League season. He signed as a free agent with the Los Angeles Kings in July, 2003

Chouinard made his one NHL appearance on February 29, 2004, when the Los Angeles Kings faced the Mighty Ducks of Anaheim at the Arrowhead Pond. Midway through the third, forward Steve Rucchin scored to give the Ducks a 6–3 lead. Starter Cristobal Huet, was pulled and Chouinard completed the game, stopping two shots he faced.

Career statistics

Regular season and playoffs

Awards 
 Named to the Quebec Major Junior Hockey League All-Star First Team, 1998–99.
 Winner of the Michel Briere Trophy, 1998–99.

Transactions 
 Selected by Ottawa Senators in first round (first Senators pick, 15th overall) of NHL entry draft, June 27, 1998.
 Returned to draft, and selected by Senators in the second round (second Senators pick, 45th overall) of NHL entry draft, June 24, 2000.
 Signed as free agent by Los Angeles Kings, July 7, 2003.
 Signed as free agent by San Diego Gulls (ECHL), September 28, 2004.
 Signed as free agent by Peoria Rivermen (ECHL), March 27, 2005.

See also
 List of players who played only one game in the NHL

References

External links
 
 Chouinard at hockeygoalies.org

1980 births
Living people
Binghamton Senators players
Canadian ice hockey goaltenders
Cincinnati Mighty Ducks players
Grand Rapids Griffins (IHL) players
Ice hockey people from Quebec
Los Angeles Kings players
Manchester Monarchs (AHL) players
National Hockey League first-round draft picks
Ottawa Senators draft picks
Peoria Rivermen (ECHL) players
Phoenix RoadRunners players
Reading Royals players
San Diego Gulls (ECHL) players
Shawinigan Cataractes players
Sportspeople from Laval, Quebec